This is a list of members of the Victorian Legislative Assembly from 1958 to 1961, as elected at the 1958 state election:

 On 12 September 1958, the Labor member for Footscray, Ernie Shepherd, died. Labor candidate Bill Divers won the resulting by-election on 8 October 1958.
 On 11 July 1960, the Liberal member for Scoresby, George Knox, died. Liberal candidate Bill Borthwick won the resulting by-election on 17 September 1960.
 In September 1960, the Country member for Ballarat North, Russell White, resigned to take up a position on the Trotting Control Board. Liberal candidate Tom Evans won the resulting by-election on 12 November 1960.

Members of the Parliament of Victoria by term
20th-century Australian politicians